The name Cassano may refer to:

People
Antonio Cassano, an Italian football player
Eleonora Cassano, an Argentine ballet dancer	
Joseph Cassano, a controversial insurance executive who was an officer at AIG Financial Products
Mario Cassano, an Italian football player

Places
Cassano allo Ionio, a town in Calabria, Italy
Cassano d'Adda, a town in Lombardy, Italy
Cassano delle Murge, a town in Apulia, Italy
Cassano Irpino, a town in Campania, Italy
Cassano Magnago, a town in Lombardy (province of Varese), Italy
Cassano Spinola, a municipality in province of Alessandria, Italy

Italian-language surnames